Comparison of methods for file sharing - The following tables compares the details of the different methods for file sharing.

Security

Anonymity

Availability of sources

veracity

File sharing